Rosemary Aitken (born 1942) is an English author, who has written a number of academic textbooks and historical novels under her own name, and a series of whodunnits set in Roman Britain under the pen name of Rosemary Rowe. 

Her writings are similar to those of Philip Boast, Gloria Cook and Winston Graham.

Biography
Rosemary Aitken was born in Cornwall but spent much of her early life in New Zealand. Her professional career was spent teaching English Language and she has written a number of textbooks on this subject. Her first historical novel, The Girl from Penvarris, was published in 1995, the first in a series set in a fictional Cornish village.

Under the name Rosemary Rowe she has written a series of historical mysteries, set in and around the Roman town of Glevum, (modern-day Gloucester). The detective in the stories, named Libertus, is a pavement-maker, whose expertise in mosaic patterns parallels his skill in resolving puzzling crimes.

Bibliography

Cornish Sagas
 The Girl from Penvarris (1995)
 The Tinner's Daughter (1996)
 Cornish Harvest (1998)
 Stormy Waters (2000)
 The Silent Shore (2001)
 The Granite Cliffs (2002)
 A Cornish Maid (2010)
 Flowers for Miss Pengelly. 
 The Blacksmiths Daughter.

Libertus Roman mysteries 
 The Germanicus Mosaic (1999)
 A Pattern of Blood (2000)
 Murder in the Forum (2001)
 The Chariots of Calyx (2002)
 The Legatus Mystery (2003)
 The Ghosts of Glevum (2004)
 Enemies of the Empire (2005)
 A Roman Ransom (2006)
 A Coin for the Ferryman (2007)
 Death at Pompeia's Wedding (2008)
 Requiem for a Slave (2010)
 The Vestal Vanishes (2011)
 A Whispering of Spies (2012)
 Dark Omens (2013)
 The Fateful Day (2014)
 The Ides of June (2016)
 The Price of Freedom  (2018)
 A Prisoner of Privilege  (2019)
 A Dreadful Destiny  (2021)

Novels
 Against the Tide (2004)
 The Tregenza Girls (2006)
 From Penvarris with Love (2008)
"Flowers for Miss Pengelly" (2012)

Textbooks
 Make up Your Mind (1982)
 Teaching Tenses (2002)
 Writing a Novel: A Practical Guide (2003)
 Teach Yourself, Creative Writing Masterclass: Writing Crime Fiction (2014)

References

External links
 http://www.raitken.wyenet.co.uk/

1942 births
Living people
English crime fiction writers
Writers of historical mysteries